Freddie Fox may refer to:

People
 Freddie Fox (actor) (born 1989), English actor
 Freddie Fox (footballer) (1898–1968), English football goalkeeper
 Freddie Fox (jockey) (1888–1945), British horse racing jockey
 Freddie Foxxx (born 1969), also known as Bumpy Knuckles, American rapper

Other uses
 Freddy Fox, a character from the Peppa Pig series

See also
 Frederick Fox (disambiguation)
 Fred Fox (disambiguation)